Lorenzo Andrenacci (born 2 January 1995) is an Italian football player. He plays for Brescia.

Club career
He made his Serie B debut for Brescia on 3 March 2015 in a game against Modena.

On 16 February 2020 he made his Serie A debut for Brescia in a game against Juventus.

On 12 July 2021, he signed with Genoa. On 31 January 2022, Andrenaccci returned to Brescia on loan. On 18 June 2022, he moved to Brescia on a permanent basis.

References

External links
 

1995 births
People from Fermo
Footballers from Marche
Living people
Italian footballers
Brescia Calcio players
Como 1907 players
Alma Juventus Fano 1906 players
Genoa C.F.C. players
Serie A players
Serie B players
Serie C players
Association football goalkeepers
Sportspeople from the Province of Fermo